Reto Ziegler is a Swiss curler.

At the national level, he is a two-time Swiss men's champion curler (1995, 1998).

Teams

References

External links

Living people
Swiss male curlers
Swiss curling champions
Year of birth missing (living people)